Green Lake (also known as Lake Wahbekanetta) is a large lake in the Lower Peninsula of the U.S. state of Michigan. Located within Grand Traverse County, Green Lake is one of two lakes the forms the isthmus of Interlochen, the other being Duck Lake. Green Lake is the primary source of the Betsie River, which flows west into Benzie County to Lake Michigan. 

Green Lake is primarily within the eponymous Green Lake Township, although a small portion extends south into Grant Township.

Between Green Lake and Duck Lake are Interlochen State Park and Interlochen Center for the Arts, a prestigious boarding school.

See also
List of lakes in Michigan

References

Lakes of Michigan
Lakes of Grand Traverse County, Michigan